Aabroo (Honour) is a 1968 Hindi romantic crime drama film directed by C. L. Rawal. The story, screenplay and dialogue were written by G. L. Rawal. It was produced by B. L. Rawal under the Rawal Films banner. The music directors were Sonik-Omi and the lyricist was G. L. Rawal. The director of photography was M. N. Malhotra. The film starred Ashok Kumar, Nirupa Roy, Vimi, Rehman, Leela Naidu, Shashikala and Deepak Kumar.

The story revolves around two lovers, Manish and Neena, who are separated when Neena is forced to marry her sister's husband. The husband is killed and Manish is arrested for his murder.

Plot
Manish lives with his brother Anand an advocate and sister-in-law Tilottama, in Kashmir. Manish has just returned from abroad having completed his medical degree. Neena has come to Kashmir for her holidays, meets Manish and they fall in love. Manish is waiting to get a job confirmation from one of the hospitals in Bombay. Neena's sister Sharda lives with her husband Chandrashekhar Verma in Bombay. The two are very much in love with each other. Being childless, Sharda is harassed by her mother-in-law Mrs. Verma. Sharda asks Shekhar to get married again, but he refuses. Mrs. Verma's harassment of Sharda turns to tragedy when two relatives Darwajalal and Shanta come to live with them. Neena is also staying in the house with her sister. Darwazalal poisons Sharda, who while dying makes Neena promise that she will marry Chandrashekhar. After Sharda dies, Neena and a distraught Chandrashekhar get married. Chandrashekhar has no interest in Neena as he is still grieving the loss of his beloved wife Sharda.

Manish finally gets a job in Bombay and Anand asks him to stay with his good friend Chandrashekhar till he settles in. On arriving at Chandrashekhar's house, Manish is shocked to find the girl he loves, Neena, now married to Chandrashekhar. Darwajalal and Shanta start rumours regarding Manish and Neena, however, Chandrashekhar overhears Darwajalal's plotting, but is hit on the head by him. His situation is critical and the attending doctor is Manish. When Chandrashekhar dies, Manish is arrested for murder. After a court scene where Anand fights for the prosecution and his wife Tillottama defends Manish, the nefarious planning of Darwajalal and Shanta is revealed.

Cast
 Ashok Kumar as Advocate Anand
 Nirupa Roy as Tilottama
 Rehman as Chandrashekhar Verma
 Leela Naidu as Sharda Verma
 Deepak Kumar as Dr. Manish
 Vimi as Neena 
 Jeevan as Darwajalal
 Shashikala as Shanta
 Lalita Pawar as Mrs. Verma
 Tun Tun as Whisky Rani
 Sunder as Whisky Rani's Husband
 Mukri as Munim Barimal Khatamal
 Niranjan Sharma as Judge
 Praveen Paul as Neena's Grandmother

Soundtrack
The music was composed by the duo Sonik-Omi while the lyricist was G. L. Rawal. The playback singers were Asha Bhosle, Mohammed Rafi, Mukesh and Manna Dey.

Song list

References

External links

1968 films
1960s Indian films
Films scored by Sonik-Omi
1960s Hindi-language films
Hindi-language crime films
Romantic crime films